St Simon and St Jude's Church, Norwich is a Grade I listed redundant parish church in the Church of England in Norwich.

History

The church dates from the 14th century. From 1952 it was used as a Scout Hall.

References

Saints Simon and Jude
14th-century church buildings in England
Grade I listed buildings in Norfolk